Ruschianthus falcatus is a species of plant in the family Aizoaceae. It is endemic to Namibia.  Its natural habitat is rocky areas. It is the only species in the monotypic genus Ruschianthus.

References

Flora of Namibia
Aizoaceae
Aizoaceae genera
Monotypic Caryophyllales genera
Vulnerable plants
Taxonomy articles created by Polbot
Taxa named by Louisa Bolus